Kent-Olle Johansson (born 1960) is a Swedish wrestler. He was born in Gärsnäs. He won an Olympic silver medal in Greco-Roman wrestling in 1984. He placed fifth at the 1985 World Wrestling Championships.

References

External links
 

1960 births
Living people
Olympic wrestlers of Sweden
Wrestlers at the 1984 Summer Olympics
Swedish male sport wrestlers
Olympic silver medalists for Sweden
Olympic medalists in wrestling
Medalists at the 1984 Summer Olympics
20th-century Swedish people